Old Furnace is an unincorporated community located in Sussex County, Delaware, United States. It is adjacent to the Old Furnace Wildlife Area.

The community is part of the Salisbury, Maryland-Delaware Metropolitan Statistical Area.

References

Unincorporated communities in Sussex County, Delaware
Unincorporated communities in Delaware